This page lists German Transportation Ministers. See also lists of incumbents.

List

German Reich (1918–1945) 
Political Party:

 The SPD withdrew from the Stresemann II Cabinet on 3 November 1923. The DNVP withdrew from the Luther I Cabinet on 26 October 1925.

Federal Republic of Germany (1949–present) 
Political Party:

Transportation